South Lake is a suburb of Perth, Western Australia in the City of Cockburn.

History
The suburb's name was proposed by Taylor Woodrow Homes Builders and the City of Cockburn in March 1982 after a previous suggestion (Oxley) had been rejected because of duplication. It is situated to the south of North Lake, hence the name. The suburb name was approved in August 1982.

Geography
It is bounded by the freight rail line to the north, the Kwinana Freeway to the east, Berrigan Drive, Semple Court and North Lake Road to the south and North Lake Road to the west.

Facilities

Education
The suburb contains two schools: South Lake Primary School and Lakeland Senior High School.

Recreation
The South Lake Leisure Centre, which contained indoor pools, gymnasium and hardball courts, adjacent to the Lakeland High School was closed and replaced by the Cockburn ARC in May 2017. The former South Lake Leisure Centre buildings were transferred to the Department of Education.

A field hockey facility was then constructed in the area to the west of the former Leisure Centre, which is the current home of the Fremantle Hockey Club.

References

External links

Suburbs of Perth, Western Australia
Suburbs in the City of Cockburn